Georgios Kaldis was a Greek boxer. He competed in the men's middleweight event at the 1928 Summer Olympics.

References

Year of birth missing
Year of death missing
Greek male boxers
Olympic boxers of Greece
Boxers at the 1928 Summer Olympics
Place of birth missing
Middleweight boxers
Constantinopolitan Greeks
Sportspeople from Istanbul
20th-century Greek people